Shab Khaneh (also Romanized as Shab Khāneh; also known as Shab Khāna and Shebkhane) is a village in Misheh Pareh Rural District, in the Central District of Kaleybar County, East Azerbaijan Province, Iran. At the 2006 census, its population was 48, in 10 families.

References 

Populated places in Kaleybar County